This is a list of years in South Africa.

Before European colonization 
BCE in Southern Africa
Early CE in Southern Africa
13th century
14th century

Colonization 
15th century
16th century

Union of South Africa

Republic of South Africa

Post Apartheid

See also 
 Timelines of cities in South Africa: Cape Town, Durban, Johannesburg, Port Elizabeth, Pretoria

Bibliography
 Historical dictionary of South Africa, Christopher Saunders, Nicholas Southey' 2nd Edition, Lanham, Md., London: Scarecrow Press
 Manual of South African Geography: Forming a Companion to the Map of South Africa to 16°  South Latitude.

published in 20th century
pre-1990s
 
 Standard Encyclopaedia of Southern Africa, DJ Potgieter, Cape Town: NASOU, 1970
 Five Hundred years: a history of South Africa, CFJ Muller, 3rd rev., Pretoria Academica, 1981
 Reader's Digest Illustrated Guide to Southern Africa 5th Edition , 1985
 Who did what in South Africa, Mona De Beer, Craighall, South Africa, AD Donker, 1988

1990s
  
 Who's who in South African politics, Shelagh Gastrow, 3rd Edition, Johannesburg, Ravan Press, 1990
 Who's who in South African politics, Shelagh Gastrow, 4th Edition, Johannesburg, Ravan Press, 1992
 New dictionary of South African biography, edited by E.J. Verwey, Pretoria: HSRC Publishers, 1995 ANC's Statement to the Truth and Reconciliation Commission, 1996
 Africa Confidential who's who of Southern Africa, edited by Patrick Smith, Oxford, Malden, MA: Blackwell, 1998 A-Z of South African Politics: the Essential Handbook, 1999, edited by Phillip Van Niekerk and Barbara Ludman, London, NY: Penguin Books 
 Nuusdagboek: feite en fratse oor 1000 jaar, F Wallis, Kaapstad: Human & Rousseau, 2000

published in 21st century

External links
 
 Atlas of Mutual Heritage
 
 Encyclopædia Britannica Online
 Independent Online
 Liberation Archive
 News24

 
South Africa history-related lists
South Africa